Fuscoptilia is a genus of moths in the family Pterophoridae.

Species
Fuscoptilia emarginatus (Snellen, 1884)
Fuscoptilia hoenei Arenberger, 1999
Fuscoptilia jarosi Arenberger, 1991

Exelastini
Moth genera